Monika Treut (born April 6, 1954, in Mönchengladbach, North Rhine-Westphalia, Germany) is a German filmmaker. She made her feature film debut with Seduction: The Cruel Woman (co-directed by Elfi Mikesch), a film that explores sadomasochistic sex practices. She has made over 20 films, including the short documentaries Annie and My Father is Coming. Treut’s involvement extends across writing, directing, editing and acting.

Education and career
Treut attended high school at an all-girls state school. She studied literature and Political Science at Philipps-University, Marburg. She wrote her PhD thesis about The Cruel Woman: Female Images in the Writing of Marquis de Sade and Leopold von Sacher-Masoch. After passing the state examination she graduated in 1978.

During her studies at university in the mid-1970s she began working with video. She worked as a media associate in Marburg, Frankfurt, and Berlin.
In 1984, Treut earned her doctorate degree in philology from the University of Marburg. That same year she founded Hyena Filmproduktion together with Elfi Mikesch, and began producing, writing, and directing independent feature films. The following year Treut made her feature film debut with Seduction: The Cruel Woman, a film that explored sadomasochistic sex practices. Treut also spent time in America during the 1980s. Traveling and working in San Francisco and New York City, Treut met and worked with Annie Sprinkle and Werner Schroeter, while also producing some of her own films. These relationships led to the films Annie (documentary short), My Father is Coming and Encounter with Werner Schroeter (documentary short).

Famous for her queer films, Treut also makes documentaries. Her films have explored many interests around the world. The subject matter varies from film to film; whether queer-themed, or about one woman's efforts to help street kids in Rio de Janeiro, or about the culinary arts of Taiwan—her documentaries find interesting, real people to focus on.

Throughout her film career Treut has been involved in several aspects of filmmaking, including acting, directing, producing, writing, filming, and editing. Her film catalogue includes over 20 films, both in her native language German and in English.

Works
 "How Does the Camel Go Through the Needle's Eye?" ("Wie Geht das Kamel durchs Nadelöhr?") (1981)
 "Unknown Gender. Das Dritte Geschlecht" (1983)
 "Bondage" (1983)
 "Seduction: The Cruel Woman" ("Verführung: Die Grausame Frau") (1985)
 "Virgin Machine" ("Die Jungfrauenmaschine") (1988)
 "Annie" (1989)
 "My Father is Coming" (1991)
 "Dr. Paglia" (1992)
 "Max" (1992)
 "Female Misbehavior" (1992)
 "Erotique" ("Let's Talk About Sex") (1994)
 "Didn't Do It For Love" (1998)
 "Gendernauts: A Journey Through Shifting Identities" (1999)
 "Warrior of Light" ("Kriegerin des Lichts") (2001)
 "Encounter with Werner Schroeter" ("Begegnung mit Werner Schroeter") (2003)
 "Tigerwomen Grow Wings" ("Den Tigerfrauen wachsen Flügel") (2004)
 "Jumpcut: A Travel Diary" ("Axensprung: Ein Reisetagebuch") (2004)
 "Made in Taiwan" (2005)
 "Ghosted" (2008)
 "Lesbian Nation" (2009)
 "The Raw and the Cooked" ("Das Rohe und das Gekochte") (2012)
 "Of Girls and Horses" (2014)
"Zona Norte" (2016)
"Genderation" (2021)

Awards 

Treut has been recognized on several occasions for her excellence in filmmaking, having taken home the following awards for her work: 
 1991 Best Feature Film for "My Father is Coming" at the Torino International Gay & Lesbian Film Festival
 1999 Best Documentary Film for "Gendernauts: A Journey Through Shifting Identities" at the Torino International Gay & Lesbian Film Festival
 1999 Audience Award for "Gendernauts" at the São Paulo International Film Festival
 2002 Audience Award for "Warrior of Light" at the Thessaloniki Documentary Film Festival
 2007 Judges Award for "Tigerwomen Grow Wings" at the San Diego Women Film Festival
2016  Teddy Best Documentary Film Award for "Zona Norte" at the Berlin International Film Festival
 2017 Teddy Award for lifetime achievement at the Berlin Film Festival
* 2017 Honorary Award for lifetime achievement at the Tel Aviv LBGT Film Festival

Humanitarian work
Treut has been involved with "PROJETO UERE", an organization founded by Yvonne Bezzerra de Mello, the subject of Treut's film Warrior of Light. "PROJETO UERE" is a program created to help the street kids of Rio de Janeiro.

Recent work
Her most recent film, Genderation, is a documentary that revisits the subjects of Treut's previous film, Gendernauts: A Journey Through Shifting Identities, 20 years later. The film looks at how the city of San Francisco has changed from being a center for the lgbtq+ community, to being take over by gentrification, and the Trump administration. It was released in Germany in 2021.

Zona Norte revisits the human rights activist working with traumatized children in the streets Rio, Yvonne Bezerra de Mello, 15 years after the 2001, award-winning documentary, Warrior of the Light. The film follows up on the lives and progress of the children from the previous documentary, who have now grown into young adults. It premiered in Germany in February 2016.

Of Girls and Horses, focuses on the relationship that develops between 16-year-old high school dropout Alex and upper-class Kathy at a horse farm. Alex works at the horse farm for a school internship, supervised by lesbian riding instructor Nina. In an interview from the website Afterellen, conducted by Marcie Bianco, Treut reveals her intentions for the movie and the message she hopes it will send.  She says, "In this film, I just wanted to picture [the insecurities that queer teenagers face] and find a way of coming out of it...".

In The Raw and the Cooked, Treut travels around Taiwan, exploring its rich culinary traditions and their relationship to the island's unique culture. The film also seeks out people who attempt to create a sustainable food system through innovative projects. 
The film had its world premiere at the Culinary Film section of the Berlin International Film Festival on February 12, 2012.

In a book written by Ya-chen Chen, an author known for her work regarding Chinese Feminism, there is a section of the book that mentions Monika Treut’s film, Ghosted.  Chen praises Treut for her ability to, “…exceed not only the essentialist restriction of physiology but also the corporeality that ghosts lose after deaths…”  Chen also says that Treut did a good job at portraying a variety of different Chinese Religions and their beliefs regarding ghosts.

Teaching
Since 1990, Treut has been teaching, lecturing and curating retrospectives of her work at colleges across the United States (Vasser, Hollins, Dartmouth), at art institutes (SFAI) and at universities (IU Bloomington, UI Chicago, UC San Diego and Cornell U).

Further reading
Gerfried Stocker, Christine Schoepf, eds. Gendernauts. In: Next Sex. Wien and New York, 2000. 
Knight, Julia. The Meaning of Treut. In: Immortal Invisible. Tamsin Wilton ed. New York and London, Routledge 1995 
Kuzniar, Alice A. Didn`t Do it for Love. The Queer German Cinema. Stanford University Press 2000. 
Pietropaolo, Laura, and Ada Testaferri. Feminisms in the Cinema. Bloomington: Indiana UP, 1995. Print.

See also 
 List of female film and television directors
 List of lesbian filmmakers
 List of LGBT-related films directed by women

References

External links 

Hyena Films
Monika Treut films trailers on YouTube

1954 births
Living people
People from Mönchengladbach
Film people from North Rhine-Westphalia
Lesbian screenwriters
German lesbian writers
LGBT film directors
LGBT film producers
German LGBT screenwriters
German women film directors
German women film producers
German women screenwriters